The 2018 San Diego Toreros football team represented the University of San Diego during the 2018 NCAA Division I FCS football season. They were led by sixth-year head coach Dale Lindsey and played their home games at Torero Stadium. They were a member of the Pioneer Football League. They finished the season 9–3, 8–0 in PFL play to be PFL champions. They earned the PFL's automatic bid to the FCS Playoffs where they lost in the first round to Nicholls.

Previous season 
The Toreros finished the 2017 season 10–3, 8–0 in PFL play to be crowned Pioneer Football League champions. They received the PFL's automatic bid to the FCS Playoffs where they defeated Northern Arizona in the first round before losing to North Dakota State in the second round for the second consecutive year.

Preseason

Award watch lists

Preseason All-PFL team
The PFL released their preseason all-PFL team on July 30, 2018, with the Toreros having four players selected.

Offense

Anthony Lawrence – QB

Zack Nelson – FB

Daniel Cooney – OL

Defense

Connor Spencer – DL

Preseason coaches poll
The PFL released their preseason coaches poll on July 31, 2018, with the Toreros predicted to finish as PFL champions.

Schedule

Game summaries

Western New Mexico

at UC Davis

at Harvard

Stetson

at Morehead State

Dayton

at Butler

Jacksonville

at Drake

Davidson

at Marist

FCS Playoffs

at Nicholls–First Round

Ranking movements

References

San Diego
San Diego Toreros football seasons
Pioneer Football League champion seasons
San Diego
San Diego Toreros football